Led Zeppelin Remasters is a three-LP (or two-cassette or two-CD) compilation album of digitally remastered material by English rock band Led Zeppelin. Containing songs from the band's eight studio albums, it was initially released in the UK and Japan by Atlantic Records on 15 October 1990. The album is essentially a scaled-down version of the four-CD Led Zeppelin Boxed Set.


Track listing

"Misty Mountain Hop" and "The Rain Song" were not included on the LP edition of the album.

Sales chart performance

Certifications and sales

Release history

Personnel
Led Zeppelin
John Bonham – drums, percussion
John Paul Jones – bass guitar, keyboards, mandolin
Jimmy Page – acoustic and electric guitars, production, remastering, digital remastering
Robert Plant – vocals, harmonica

Additional musicians
Sandy Denny – vocals on "The Battle of Evermore".
Ian Stewart – piano on "Rock and Roll"

production
Yves Beauvais – producer
Perry Cooper – executive producer
Bob Defrin – art direction
Larry Fremantle – design
Peter Grant – executive producer
Bob Gruen – photography
Richard "Hutch" Hutchison – design co-ordinator
John Kubick – digital editing and transfers
George Marino – digital remastering
Jennifer Moore – photography and imaging
Aubrey Powell – photography
Jodi Rovin – design
Rhonda Schoen – digital editing and transfers
Chris Wroe – photography and imaging

Led Zeppelin Remasters (Bonus Disc edition)

Led Zeppelin Remasters (Bonus Disc edition) is a three-CD and three-cassette compilation album long-case digipak of remastered material by English rock group Led Zeppelin. The discs came in a multicolour dayglo label reflected on the box set cover. It was released in the US by Atlantic Records on 21 February 1992. This release includes a bonus CD featuring promotional interviews with Jimmy Page, Robert Plant and John Paul Jones, included in a sleeve pouch with liner notes from the original Remasters release.

Revised track listing

Disc three Profiled
1) Led Zeppelin Profile
2–8) Jimmy Page Station Liners
9–20) Jimmy Page interview
21–32) Robert Plant interview
33–43) John Paul Jones interview

Disc three was originally issued under the title Profiled, as a promotional accompaniment to the Led Zeppelin Boxed Set.

Sales chart performance

Sales certification

Release history

Personnel
Led Zeppelin
John Bonham – drums
John Paul Jones – bass guitar, keyboards, mandolin
Jimmy Page – guitars, production
Robert Plant – vocals, harmonica, tambourine

Additional musicians
Sandy Denny – vocals on "The Battle of Evermore"
Ian Stewart – piano on "Rock and Roll"

See also
List of best-selling albums in Australia

References

External links
Atlanticrecords.com Remasters

Atlantic Records compilation albums
Led Zeppelin compilation albums
1990 compilation albums
1992 compilation albums
Folk rock compilation albums
Albums produced by Jimmy Page